Mart Meri (born 15 February 1959 in Tallinn) is an Estonian politician. He was a member of IX Riigikogu.

His father was Lennart Meri.

References

Living people
1959 births
Members of the Riigikogu, 1999–2003
Members of the Riigikogu, 2003–2007
Members of the Riigikogu, 2011–2015